Minuscule 485 (in the Gregory-Aland numbering), ε 247 (in the Soden numbering), is a Greek minuscule manuscript of the New Testament, on parchment. Palaeographically it has been assigned to the 12th-century. 
Scrivener labeled it by number 572.
The manuscript is lacunose. It contains liturgical books: Synaxarion and Menologion.

Description 

The codex contains the text of the four Gospels on 255 parchment leaves (size ) with some lacunae (Luke 5:22-9:32; 11:31-13:25; 17:25-18:3; John 8:14-21:25). The text is written in one column per page, 23-25 lines per page.

There is also another division according to the smaller Ammonian Sections (in red ink), whose numbers are given at the margin, but there is no references to the Eusebian Canons.
It used capital letters at the beginning of each section.

The breathings and accents are complete but very inaccurate (e.g. Matthew 13:2.33; 24:41; 25:6; Mark 5:3.4; 6:26; Luke 24:6; John 7:30). There is no ι subscriptum, but adscriptum (Matthew 26:52; John 1:40.41), ν εφελκυστικον gets very frequent in the manuscript, and is often destroyed by secunda manu (second hand), even so often as to produce an hiatus (e.g. John 5:25; 7:6.27). A later hand is very busy in the margin, supplying the omissions through homoeoteleuton of the first scribe, or altering the original readings. There are more itacisms than in many other manuscripts.

Text 

The Greek text of the codex is a representative of the Byzantine text-type. Aland placed it in Category V.
According to the Claremont Profile Method it represents textual family Kx in Luke 1, Luke 10, and Luke 20.

History 

The manuscript was held in Escorial, then it belonged to Charles Burney, as codices 480, 481, 482, 484, and ℓ 184. It was purchased to the British Museum in 1818.

The manuscript was added to the list of New Testament manuscripts by Scrivener, who thoroughly it examined and collated. Scrivener published its text in 1852.

It is currently housed at the British Library (Burney MS 23) in London.

See also 

 List of New Testament minuscules
 Biblical manuscript
 Textual criticism

References

Further reading 

  (as s)

External links 

 R. Waltz, Minuscule 485 at the Encyclopedia of Textual Criticism
 Minuscule 485 at the British Library

Greek New Testament minuscules
12th-century biblical manuscripts
Burney Collection